Seasons in the Underground is the third studio album recorded by The Moog. The album was recorded at the London Bridge Studio in Seattle, Washington, and was mixed at the Total Access Recording in Redondo Beach, California, except tracks 1, 3, 7, 10 at the Bay 7 Studios in Los Angeles, California. The album was produced by Ken Scott (the producer of David Bowie), except tracks 1, 3, 7, 10 by Jun Murakawa.

Background and recording
On 15 January 2013, Ádám Bajor (former guitarist of The Moog) claimed that they had everything for the recording of the Seasons in the Underground except the songs ready. “We recorded ten new songs among which 5 songs were completed only at the studio. It was a survival period for the band. We were definitely in the middle of a crisis. Ken Scott, who is an excellent producer, was waiting for us with complete plans. We didn't have any plans we weren't prepared for the recording. When in a studio you are expected to have 100 versions for a guitar solo and the task of the producer is to select the right one, but we didn't have. You can feel our uncertainty on this record.”

Track listing

References

External links
 Razzmatazz Orfeum at MuSick Recordings webpage

2012 albums
The Moog albums